Barriles Airport   is an airport  east-southeast of Tocopilla, a Pacific coastal town in the Antofagasta Region of Chile.

There is distant high terrain northwest through northeast.

See also

Transport in Chile
List of airports in Chile

References

External links
Barriles Airport at OpenStreetMap
Barriles Airport at OurAirports

Airports in Antofagasta Region